Erasmus Pagendorfer (died 1561) was a Roman Catholic prelate who served as Auxiliary Bishop of Passau (1557–1561) and Titular Bishop of Symbalia.

Biography
On 24 Mar 1557, Erasmus Pagendorfer was appointed during the papacy of Pope Paul IV as Auxiliary Bishop of Passau and Titular Bishop of Symbalia. On 25 Jul 1558, he was consecrated bishop by Urban Sagstetter, Bishop of Gurk. He served as Auxiliary Bishop of Passau until his death on 15 Jul 1561.

See also 
Catholic Church in Germany

References 

16th-century Roman Catholic bishops in Bavaria
Bishops appointed by Pope Paul IV
1561 deaths